Sishya is a 1997 Tamil-language romantic comedy film directed by Selva. The film stars Karthik and Roshini. The film was produced by Tharangai V. Sunder and had musical scores by Deva.

Plot
Shruti (Roshini), the daughter of a minister, flees to Chennai from Delhi where she falls in love with Aravindan (Karthik). But fate separates the couple when the C.B.I (Nizhalgal Ravi) finds her and sends her back to Delhi.

Cast

Karthik as Aravind
Roshini as Shruti / Anu
Goundamani as Aravind's friend
Manivannan as Police inspector Malachamy
Visu as Aadhimoolam
Sonia as Anu, Aadhimoolam's daughter
Thyagu
Vivek
Nizhalgal Ravi as C.B.I Ashok Narayanan
Crazy Mohan as Manager
Chitti Babu as Minister
Gowtham Sundararajan as Gowtham
Mohan V. Ram
Vichu Vishwanath
LIC Narasimhan
Vichithra as Special appearance

Soundtrack

The soundtrack of the film was composed by Deva.

References

External links
 Sishya at oneindia entertainment

1997 films
Films scored by Deva (composer)
Indian action films
1990s Tamil-language films
Films with screenplays by Crazy Mohan
Films directed by Selva (director)
1997 action films